This is a discography for the American singer Dawn Richard.

Albums

Studio albums

Mixtapes

Extended plays

Singles

Guest appearances

Music videos

References 

Richard, Dawn